Freese's Tavern is a historic tavern and general store at 1011 Whittier Highway, the northwest corner of the junction of New Hampshire Routes 109 and 25 in Moultonborough, New Hampshire. With a building history dating to about 1780, and a continuous history of operation as a tavern, general store, post office, library, and town hall, it is one of the oldest establishments of its type in the United States. It is presently known as The Old Country Store, and includes museum displays on its history. The building was listed on the National Register of Historic Places in 1982.

Description and history
The Old Country Store is located in the village center of Moultonborough, at the northwest corner of Whittier Highway (NH 25) and Holland Street (NH 109). The 2-1/2 story building is built out of rough-hewn timbers and sheathed in clapboards. Single-story porches shelter both street-facing facades. A shed-roofed ell, originally a stable, is attached to the south side, and a small 1-1/2 story gabled addition was added to the north side in 1870, and two additional wings were added in the 1950s.

The oldest portion of the building, now an ell, was built c. 1780 by George Freese. Freese played a leading role in local politics, and it was during his ownership that town meetings began to be held here. David Bean, the next proprietor, also served as postmaster for the town. In the late 19th century an upstairs space housed the town library. The building ceased to house the post office in 1967.

See also
National Register of Historic Places listings in Carroll County, New Hampshire

References

External links
The Old Country Store and Museum

Commercial buildings on the National Register of Historic Places in New Hampshire
Commercial buildings completed in 1780
Buildings and structures in Carroll County, New Hampshire
Museums in Carroll County, New Hampshire
National Register of Historic Places in Carroll County, New Hampshire
Moultonborough, New Hampshire